Five in a Row may refer to: 

 "Five in a Row" (1982 song)
 "Five in a Row" (1989 song), by The D-Generation
 Five in a Row (game) or Gomoku, a board game

See also
 "Five More in a Row", a 1990 single by The D-Generation